Nakihat Khanum was the first wife of the Safavid king (shah) Abbas II (1642–1666). 

She was of Circassian origin. Originally a (slave) concubine, she was the mother of Abbas II's successor, king Suleiman I (1666–1694).

Alike other females of the royal court, Nakihat bequeathed property to the Shia shrines in Iraq, which were "formally" under Ottoman control since the Treaty of Zuhab (1639).

References

Sources
 
 
 
 

Iranian people of Circassian descent
17th-century Iranian women
Safavid concubines
17th-century people of Safavid Iran
Slave concubines